Sergi Roberto Carnicer (born 7 February 1992) is a Spanish professional footballer who plays for La Liga club Barcelona and the Spain national team. Mainly a central midfielder, he can also operate as a defensive midfielder, full-back or winger.

He has spent most of his career with Barcelona after making his first-team debut at the age of 18, going on to win several accolades with the club including six La Liga championships and two Champions Leagues.

Roberto made his first full appearance for Spain in 2016.

Club career

Born in Reus, Tarragona, Catalonia, Roberto began playing football with local UE Barri Santes Creus at the age of 8, arriving in Barcelona's youth academy six years later from neighbours Gimnàstic de Tarragona. In the 2009–10 season, at only 17, he first appeared with Barças reserves, contributing 29 appearances as they returned to the Segunda División after 11 years.

On 10 November 2010, Roberto made his debut for the first team, playing the second half of a 5–1 home win against Ceuta for the campaign's Copa del Rey (7–1 on aggregate). On 27 April of the following year he made his first UEFA Champions League appearance, coming on as a substitute for David Villa in the last minute of a 2–0 away victory over Real Madrid in the competition semi-finals' first leg.

Roberto first appeared in La Liga on 21 May 2011, playing the full 90 minutes in a 3–1 win at Málaga in the season's last round. His first start for the main squad came on 6 December of that year, against BATE Borisov in the Champions League group stage, as manager Pep Guardiola rested all his starters for the upcoming El Clásico: in the 35th minute, he opened the scoring in an eventual 4–0 home win.

In only his third official appearance for Barcelona's first team, on 12 January 2012, Roberto scored his second goal, helping the visitors come from behind to win 2–1 against Osasuna in the domestic cup (6–1 on aggregate). On 16 December 2014, also in that competition, he netted another, contributing to an 8–1 demolition of Huesca at the Camp Nou.

In the 2015–16 season, after being reconverted by manager Luis Enrique and merely months after nearly being deemed surplus to requirements, Roberto appeared as a right-back in several games. In two consecutive matches against Athletic Bilbao in January 2016, one in the league and another in the Spanish Cup, he featured on the other flank in the place of injured Jordi Alba, going on to play in as many as seven different positions.

On 20 August 2016, Roberto started as a right-back and provided two assists in a 6–2 home defeat of Betis in the opening match of the campaign. On 24 September, from the same position, he again contributed two decisive passes in a 5–0 away rout of Sporting de Gijón.

On 8 March 2017, Roberto scored the final goal in the 95th minute as part of a decisive 6–1 home victory against Paris Saint-Germain in the second leg of the Champions League round-of-16, making Barcelona the first club to overcome a four-goal deficit in the competition. On 22 February 2018, he extended his contract until 2022.

In injury time of the first half of El Clásico on 6 May 2018, Roberto was shown a straight red card after punching Marcelo, in an eventual 2–2 home draw. He was first-choice right-back during the season ahead of newly signed Nélson Semedo, and his side won the national championship after a one-year wait.

On 3 March 2023, Roberto agreed to an extension until 2024.

International career

In October 2009, shortly after making his Barcelona B debut, Roberto was called by the Spain under-17 team for the 2009 FIFA World Cup in Nigeria. On 5 November, before being substituted by Javier Espinosa in the 88th minute, he scored a hat-trick against Burkina Faso at the Sani Abacha Stadium in Kano. Spain eventually finished third in the tournament, with him and Atlético Madrid's Borja Bastón accounting for eight of the team's total goals.

Roberto made his debut for the under-21 side on 5 September 2011, playing the last four minutes of the 2–0 win in Lugo over Georgia for the 2013 UEFA European Under-21 Championship qualifiers. He received his first call up to the senior squad in March 2016, for friendlies against Romania and Italy. His debut took place in the former match on the 27th, as he started in a 0–0 draw in Cluj-Napoca.

Style of play
Roberto plays predominantly as a full-back, but also excels in midfield. In the 2015–16 season, under Luis Enrique, he played in seven different positions with Barcelona. This versatility, combined with his pace, strength, rigorous work rate and accurate passing earned the praise of the manager: "In a team like ours, except in goal, he could play in any position, it's no surprise. The most difficult thing is doing it well all over the field and Sergi Roberto does that." He is best utilized as a box-to-box player.

Personal life
In 2014, Roberto started dating Israeli model Coral Simanovich (step-daughter of Israeli singer and former politician Pnina Rosenblum). They became engaged in early September 2017, and got married in Tel Aviv on 30 May 2018. Their first child, Kaia, was born in 2019.

Roberto's mother, María Rosa Carnicer, died in December 2019, a year after being diagnosed with amyotrophic lateral sclerosis.

Career statistics
Club

Notes

International

Scores and results list Spain's goal tally first, score column indicates score after each Roberto goal

HonoursBarcelonaLa Liga: 2010–11, 2012–13, 2014–15, 2015–16, 2017–18, 2018–19
Copa del Rey: 2011–12, 2014–15, 2015–16, 2016–17, 2017–18, 2020–21
Supercopa de España: 2010, 2016, 2022–23
UEFA Champions League: 2010–11, 2014–15
UEFA Super Cup: 2015
FIFA Club World Cup: 2015Spain U17FIFA U-17 World Cup third place: 2009SpainUEFA Nations League runner-up: 2020–21Individual'
UEFA Champions League Breakthrough XI: 2016
Catalan Footballer of the Year: 2016–17

References

External links

FC Barcelona official profile

1992 births
Living people
People from Reus
Sportspeople from the Province of Tarragona
Spanish footballers
Footballers from Catalonia
Association football defenders
Association football midfielders
Association football utility players
La Liga players
Segunda División players
Segunda División B players
FC Barcelona Atlètic players
FC Barcelona players
UEFA Champions League winning players
Spain youth international footballers
Spain under-21 international footballers
Spain international footballers
Catalonia international footballers